William George Curlin (August 30, 1927 – December 23, 2017) was an American prelate of the Roman Catholic Church who served as bishop of the Diocese of Charlotte in North Carolina from 1994 to 2002.  He previously served as an auxiliary bishop of the Archdiocese of Washington from 1988 to 1994.

Biography

Early life 
William Curlin was born on August 30, 1927, in Portsmouth, Virginia.  Curlin was the son of Mary and Stephen Curlin. He attended St. John's College and later Georgetown University in Washington, D.C.  Curlin then entered St. Mary's Seminary and University in Baltimore, Maryland.

Priesthood 
Curlin was ordained a priest by Cardinal Patrick O'Boyle in Washington D.C., on May 25, 1957. He served in mostly poor parishes, opened a women's shelter and 20 kitchens for the poor and homeless throughout the Washington area. Curlin and Mother Teresa championed the opening of the Gift of Peace Home, a residence in Washington for people with HIV/AIDS.

Auxiliary Bishop of Washington 
Pope John Paul II appointed Curlin as an auxiliary bishop of the Archdiocese of Washington D.C. and titular bishop of Rossmarkaeum on November 2, 1988.  He was consecrated by Cardinal James Hickey on December 20, 1988.  Curlin served as vicar for the Theological College at the Catholic University of America from 1974 to 1980 and as chair of Associated Catholic Charities in Baltimore.

Bishop of Charlotte 
John Paul II appointed Curlin as the third bishop of the Diocese of Charlotte on February 22, 1994; he was installed on April 13, 1994.

Curtin started the first affordable housing initiative in the diocese and concentrated on ministry to the elderly, sick and dying. As bishop, Curlin continued his ministry to the poor, ordained 28 men to the priesthood and opened numerous Churches throughout the diocese.  On June 13, 1995, Curlin invited Mother Teresa to speak at the Charlotte Coliseum, drawing a crowd of over 19,000.  In 1995, Curlin stated that any priest in the diocese who had been accused of sexual abuse of a minor would be immediately removed from ministry.

When Mother Teresa died in 1997, Curlin travelled to Calcutta, India, to attend her funeral as a representative of the US Conference of Catholic Bishops.

On September 10, 2002, John Paul II accepted Curlin's resignation as bishop of the Diocese of Charlotte.  William Curlin died in Charlotte on December 23, 2017 at age 90.

See also

 Catholic Church hierarchy
 Catholic Church in the United States
 Historical list of the Catholic bishops of the United States
 List of Catholic bishops of the United States
 Lists of patriarchs, archbishops, and bishops

References

External links
Roman Catholic Diocese of Charlotte Official Site
Catholic Hierarchy website profile
Special Reports: Catholic Bishops and Sex Abuse
New York Times article
Catholic News Herald story

1927 births
2017 deaths
People from Portsmouth, Virginia
21st-century Roman Catholic bishops in the United States
Roman Catholic Diocese of Charlotte
Catholics from Virginia
Roman Catholic bishops in North Carolina
20th-century Roman Catholic bishops in the United States